The Swinging Guitar of Tal Farlow is an album by American jazz guitarist Tal Farlow, released in 1957.

Track listing
"Taking a Chance on Love" (Vernon Duke, John Latouche, Ted Fetter) – 4:43
"Yardbird Suite" (Charlie Parker) – 5:15
"You Stepped Out of a Dream" (Nacio Herb Brown, Gus Kahn) – 5:39
"They Can't Take That Away from Me" (George Gershwin, Ira Gershwin) – 5:42
"Like Someone in Love" (Johnny Burke, Jimmy Van Heusen) – 6:38
"Meteor" (Tal Farlow) – 6:35
"I Love You" (Cole Porter) – 5:30
1999 reissue bonus tracks & alternate takes:
"Gone with the Wind" (Allie Wrubel, Herb Magidson) – 5:26
"Taking a Chance on Love" – 6:12
"Yardbird Suite" – 5:12
"Gone with the Wind" – 5:37

Personnel
Tal Farlow – guitar
Eddie Costa – piano
Vinnie Burke – bass
Production notes:
Norman Granz – producer

References

Tal Farlow albums
1957 albums
Albums produced by Norman Granz
Verve Records albums